Asanović may refer to:
Aleksa Asanovic, Montenegrin musician
Aljoša Asanović, Croatian footballer
Antonio Asanović, Croatian footballer
Krste Asanovic, American engineer
Sreten Asanović, Montenegrin author
Tihomir "Pop" Asanović, Croatian keyboardist, Hammond organ player and composer